Gundlachia is a genus of minute freshwater snails or limpets, aquatic pulmonate gastropod mollusks in the family Planorbidae, the ram's horn snails and their allies.

The generic name is in honor of Cuban naturalist Juan Gundlach (1810-1896).

Anatomy 
These animals have a pallial lung, as do all pulmonate snails, but they also have a false gill or "pseudobranch".  This serves as a gill as, in their non-tidal habitat, these limpets never reach the surface for air.

Distribution 
They have a worldwide distribution.

Species
Species within the genus Gundlachia include: 
 Gundlachia bakeri Pilsbry, 1913
 Gundlachia leucaspis (Ancey, 1901)
 Gundlachia lucasi Suter, 1905
 Gundlachia lutzi Walker, 1925
 Gundlachia meehiana Stimpson
 Gundlachia radiata (Guilding, 1828)
 Gundlachia ticaga (Marcus & Marcus, 1962)

Synonyms:
 Gundlachia neozelanica Suter, 1905 is a synonym for Ferrissia neozelanicus (Suter, 1905)
 Gundlachia moricandi (d'Orbigny, 1837) is a synonym for Hebetancylus moricandi (d'Orbigny, 1837)
 Gundlachia concentrica (d’Orbigny, 1835) is a synonym for Uncancylus concentricus (d'Orbigny, 1835)

References

Planorbidae
Gastropod genera
Taxa named by Juan Gundlach